Susan Carol Alpert Davis (born April 13, 1944) is a former American politician who served as the U.S. representative for  for one term and  for nine terms from 2001 to 2021. She is a member of the Democratic Party.

Her district included central and eastern portions of the city of San Diego, as well as eastern suburbs such as El Cajon, La Mesa, Spring Valley, and Lemon Grove.

Early life, education and career

Davis was born in Cambridge, Massachusetts. She has spent most of her life in California. She graduated from the University of California, Berkeley where she was a member of Delta Phi Epsilon sorority. She earned a master's degree in social work from the University of North Carolina at Chapel Hill. Her husband Steve Davis was a doctor in the Air Force during the Vietnam War. After returning to California, she became a social worker in San Diego.

Early political career

Davis became active in politics through her membership in the local branch of the League of Women Voters, of which she became president in 1977. She was elected to the board of the San Diego Unified School District in 1983. She served there until 1992, including two years as president of the body.

In 1994, she was elected to the California State Assembly, and was reelected in 1996 and 1998. In the Assembly, Davis chaired the Committee on Consumer Protection, Government Efficiency and Economic Development. She authored a state law giving women direct access to their OB/Gyn doctors without requiring a referral from their primary care physicians. Other legislation she authored established the right of a patient to obtain a second medical opinion and allowed frail senior citizens to remain in their homes while receiving state-funded nursing care. She introduced laws to reward high-achieving teachers and to establish after-school programs at public schools.

U.S. House of Representatives

In 2000, Davis challenged three-term Republican incumbent Brian Bilbray in what was then the 49th District, winning with 50 percent of the vote. Her district was renumbered the 53rd District after the 2000 Census redistricting and made somewhat more Democratic than its predecessor. Following the redistricting, she was reelected eight times without much difficulty. She is the first Democrat to represent what is now the 53rd district for more than one term in over half a century.  The only other Democrat to represent this district since the Harry Truman administration, Lynn Schenk, was toppled by Bilbray in the 1994 Republican wave.

Davis introduced a federal version of the California OB/Gyn law she authored at the start of every Congress from 2001 to 2009.  Provisions of her OB/Gyn bill were included in the health care reform bill enacted into law.

In 2011, Davis voted for the National Defense Authorization Act for Fiscal Year 2012 as part of a controversial provision that allows the government and the military to indefinitely detain American citizens and others without trial.

Davis was a member of the New Democrat Coalition and she portrayed herself as someone who was willing to work across party lines. She served on the House Armed Services Committee. She also served on the Education and Workforce Committee, where she was the Ranking Member of the Subcommittee on Higher Education and Workforce Development.

In 2012, Davis filed a lawsuit to recover over $150,000 in campaign funds from her former campaign treasurer, Kinde Durkee. Durkee was later sentenced to eight years in prison for fraud after pleading guilty to stealing seven million dollars from more than fifty people.

On September 4, 2019, Davis announced that she would not seek re-election in 2020.

Committee assignments
Committee on Education and the Workforce
Subcommittee on Higher Education and Workforce Development (Chair)
Subcommittee on Early Childhood, Elementary and Secondary Education
Committee on Armed Services
Subcommittee on Strategic Forces
Subcommittee on Seapower and Projection Forces
 Committee on House Administration

Caucus memberships
Congressional Arts Caucus
Congressional Friends of Animals Caucus
Congressional Mental Health Caucus
House Mentoring Caucus (Co-Chair)
United States Congressional International Conservation Caucus
Pro-Choice Caucus
Congressional COPD Caucus
Congressional EOD Caucus (Co-Chair)
Veterinary Medicine Caucus
Congressional Navy-Marine Corps Caucus (Co-Founder)
Afterschool Caucuses
Congressional Asian Pacific American Caucus
U.S.-Japan Caucus

Legacy 
Davis was inducted into the San Diego Women's Hall of Fame in 2020. On November 29, 2022, the House passed a bill to name a post office in Rolando, San Diego after Davis.  President Joe Biden signed the bill into law on December 27, 2022.

See also
 List of Jewish members of the United States Congress
 Women in the United States House of Representatives

References

External links
Susan Davis for Congress 

 
Join California Susan Davis

|-

|-

  -->

1944 births
21st-century American politicians
21st-century American women politicians
American people of Russian-Jewish descent
Female members of the United States House of Representatives
Jewish members of the United States House of Representatives
Jewish women politicians
Living people
Democratic Party members of the California State Assembly
Democratic Party members of the United States House of Representatives from California
Politicians from Cambridge, Massachusetts
Politicians from San Diego
School board members in California
University of California, Berkeley alumni
UNC School of Social Work alumni
Women state legislators in California
21st-century American Jews